Ballinagh is a Gaelic football club based in Ballinagh, County Cavan, Ireland.

History
The club was founded in 1888. The club reached the final of the Senior Championship in 1961 and 1986, but came up short on both occasions.

After winning the Cavan Intermediate title in 2007, Ballinagh went on to reach the Ulster final. Ballinagh beat Antrim champions Dunloy by eight points to become the first Cavan side to win the competition.

The club won their first, and to date only Senior Championship title in 2013, beating Cavan Gaels by a point in the final.

The club's most recent championship success came at the intermediate grade, winning it in 2020.

Honours
 Cavan Senior Football Championship: 1
 2013
 Ulster Intermediate Club Football Championship: 1
 2007
 Cavan Intermediate Football Championship: 4
 1979, 1992, 2007, 2020
 Cavan Junior Football Championship: 3
 1913, 1953, 1978
 Cavan Under-21 Football Championship: 1
 1978
 Cavan Minor Football Championship: 2
 1940, 1941

References

External links
Ballinagh Official Website
Official Cavan GAA Website

Gaelic games clubs in County Cavan
Gaelic football clubs in County Cavan